The 2021–22 CSA One-Day Cup was a List A cricket competition that took place in South Africa in March and April 2022. It was the first edition of the tournament in the post-franchise era, and the first edition to return to a two-division league format. Domestic cricketing reforms were introduced in 2020 that discontinued the six franchise team format and announced a return to the more traditional provincial based system. Fifteen teams, split over the two divisions, competed in the one-day tournament.

In Division 1, five of the six teams who competed in the 2020–21 CSA Four-Day Franchise Series opted to retain their franchise brand, with only the former Cape Cobras reverting to their traditional Western Province name. They were joined in Division 1 by Boland and North West. Matches featuring either Limpopo or Mpumalanga, both in Division 2, did not have List A status.

On 30 March 2022, in the Division One match between Titans and North West, Titans scored 453/3 from their 50 overs, setting a record for the highest total in a List A match in South Africa.

Following the conclusion of the round-robin matches, Titans and Lions had reached the Division One final, with KwaZulu-Natal Inland and Northern Cape reaching the Division Two final. Lions won the Division One title, beating Titans by three wickets, with Reeza Hendricks scoring 157 runs. In the Division Two final, KwaZulu-Natal Inland beat Northern Cape by five wickets to win the match.

Squads
The following squads were named for the Division One teams.

Fixtures

Division 1

Division 2

Finals

Notes

References

External links
 Division One series home at ESPN Cricinfo
 Division Two series home at ESPN Cricinfo

South African domestic cricket competitions
CSA One-Day Cup
2021–22 South African cricket season